Väinö Antero Vilponiemi (3 November 1925 – 10 September 2022) was a Finnish politician. A member of the Social Democratic Party of Finland, he served in the Parliament from 1962 to 1975.

Vilponiemi died on 10 September 2022, at the age of 96.

References

1925 births
2022 deaths
People from Noormarkku
Members of the Parliament of Finland (1962–66)
Members of the Parliament of Finland (1966–70)
Members of the Parliament of Finland (1970–72)
Members of the Parliament of Finland (1972–75)
Social Democratic Party of Finland politicians
20th-century Finnish politicians